Band of Brothers, is a 30-minute-long Korean music reality show broadcast on Mnet.

Cast
Kim Hee-chul
Jay Kim
Kangin
Kim Jung-mo

Format
Heechul and Kangin of Super Junior, and Jay and Jungmo of TRAX form a "tribute band" to not only perform music by classic pop artists  but they also explore the history about the band, their personal lives as well as the influence of their music.

Episodes

References

 Official Website

South Korean reality television series
South Korean music television shows
Mnet (TV channel) original programming
2008 South Korean television series debuts